Barbara Walker  (born Birmingham, UK) is a British artist who lives and works in Birmingham. The art historian Eddie Chambers calls her "one of the most talented, productive and committed artists of her generation". She is known for colossal figurative drawings and paintings, often drawn directly onto the walls of the gallery, that frequently explore themes of documentation and recording, and erasure. Walker describes her work as social documentary,  intended to address misunderstandings and stereotypes  about the African-Caribbean community in Britain.

Walker grew in a Jamaican family in Birmingham and graduated from the University of Central England, Birmingham in 1996. Her work is part of private and public collections including the Arts Council Collection and the Usher Gallery. She was selected to be included in the first Diaspora Pavilion at the 57th Venice Biennale 2017.

In 2017 Walker was awarded the Evelyn Williams Drawing Award, part of the Jerwood Drawing Prize. Walker was awarded the 2020 Bridget Riley Fellowship at The British School at Rome. She was appointed a Member of the Order of the British Empire (MBE) in the 2019 New Year Honours for services to British Art.

Selected exhibitions

Solo exhibitions 
 Place, Space and Who, Turner Contemporary, Margate, Kent, 2019 - 2020
 Shock and Awe, curated by Lynda Morris and Craig Ashley, mac, Birmingham, 2016
 Louder Than Words, Unit 2 Gallery, London Metropolitan University, 2006
 Testimonies, Queen's Hall, Northumberland, 2005
 Private Face, EMACA, Nottingham, 2002

Group exhibitions 
 Protest and Remembrance, Alan Cristea Gallery, 2019
 UNTITLED: Art on the Conditions of Our Time, New Art Exchange, 2017 
 The Meaning of Style: Black British Style, and the underlying political and social environment, New Art Exchange, Nottingham, 2010
 Families, Oxford House, London, 2006
 Birmingham Artsfest 06, 2006
 True Stories, Wolverhampton Art Gallery, 2003
 Intervention Project, Birmingham, 2002

References

Further reading 

 Walker, Barbara. Barbara Walker. Margate, England: Turner Contemporary, 2021. (ISBN 9781999608835)

External links
 Official site
 Barbara Walker, Arts Council Collection
 Barbara Walker, Art UK

Living people
Artists from Birmingham, West Midlands
Black British artists
British women artists
British contemporary artists
English contemporary artists
Members of the Order of the British Empire
Year of birth missing (living people)